The 2015 Wimbledon Championships are described below in detail, in the form of day-by-day summaries.

Day 1 (29 June)

Seeds out:
Men's Singles:  Tommy Robredo [19],  Pablo Cuevas [28]
Women's Singles:  Carla Suárez Navarro [9],  Flavia Pennetta [24],  Barbora Strýcová [27]
Schedule of play

Day 2 (30 June)

Seeds out:
Men's Singles:  Guillermo García-López [29],  Jack Sock [31]
Women's Singles:  Simona Halep [3],  Eugenie Bouchard [12],  Caroline Garcia [32]
Schedule of play

Day 3 (1 July)

Seeds out:
Men's Singles:  Kei Nishikori [5],  Dominic Thiem [32]
Women's Singles:  Ana Ivanovic [7],  Karolína Plíšková [11],  Sara Errani [19]
Men's Doubles:  Simone Bolelli /  Fabio Fognini [5],  Pablo Cuevas /  David Marrero [12]
Women's Doubles:  Chan Yung-jan /  Zheng Jie [13]
Schedule of play

Day 4 (2 July)

Seeds out:
Men's Singles:  Rafael Nadal [10],  Feliciano López [15],  Fabio Fognini [30]
Women's Singles:  Ekaterina Makarova [8],  Elina Svitolina [17],  Alizé Cornet [25],  Svetlana Kuznetsova [26]
Men's Doubles:  Marin Draganja /  Henri Kontinen [15]
Women's Doubles:  Anastasia Rodionova /  Arina Rodionova [15]
Schedule of play

Day 5 (3 July)

Seeds out:
Men's Singles:  Milos Raonic [7],  Grigor Dimitrov [11],  Leonardo Mayer [24],  Bernard Tomic [27]
Women's Singles:  Andrea Petkovic [14],  Samantha Stosur [22],  Irina-Camelia Begu [29]
Men's Doubles:  Marcel Granollers /  Marc López [6],  Raven Klaasen /  Rajeev Ram [14]
Women's Doubles:  Garbiñe Muguruza /  Carla Suárez Navarro [6]
Schedule of play

Day 6 (4 July)

Seeds out:
Men's Singles:  Jo-Wilfried Tsonga [13],  John Isner [17],  Gaël Monfils [18],  Andreas Seppi [25]
Women's Singles:  Petra Kvitová [2],  Angelique Kerber [10],  Sabine Lisicki [18],  Camila Giorgi [31]
Men's Doubles:  Juan Sebastián Cabal /  Robert Farah [16]
Women's Doubles:  Andrea Hlaváčková /  Lucie Hradecká [8],  Caroline Garcia /  Katarina Srebotnik [10]
Mixed Doubles:  Bob Bryan /  Caroline Garcia [4],  Jean-Julien Rojer /  Anna-Lena Grönefeld [11],  John Peers /  Chan Yung-jan [14] 
Schedule of play

Middle Sunday (5 July)

Following tradition, Middle Sunday was a day of rest.

Day 7 (6 July)

 Seeds out:
 Men's Singles:  Tomáš Berdych [6],  David Goffin [16],  Roberto Bautista Agut [20],  Viktor Troicki [22],  Ivo Karlović [23],  Nick Kyrgios [26]
 Women's Singles:  Caroline Wozniacki [5],  Lucie Šafářová [6],  Venus Williams [16],  Jelena Janković [28],  Belinda Bencic [30]
 Men's Doubles:  /  Jack Sock [3],  Pierre-Hugues Herbert /  Nicolas Mahut [10],  Daniel Nestor /  Leander Paes [11]
 Women's Doubles:  Alla Kudryavtseva /  Anastasia Pavlyuchenkova [11],  Michaëlla Krajicek /  Barbora Strýcová [14],  Anabel Medina Garrigues /  Arantxa Parra Santonja [16]
 Mixed Doubles:  Florin Mergea /  Michaëlla Krajicek [13],  Zheng Jie /  Henri Kontinen [15],  David Marrero /  Arantxa Parra Santonja [17] 
Schedule of play

Day 8 (7 July)

 Seeds out:
 Men's Singles:  Kevin Anderson [14]
 Women's Singles:  Timea Bacsinszky [15],  Madison Keys [21],  Victoria Azarenka [23]
 Men's Doubles:  Bob Bryan /  Mike Bryan [1],  Ivan Dodig /  Marcelo Melo [2],  Marcin Matkowski /  Nenad Zimonjić [7],  Alexander Peya /  Bruno Soares [8]
 Mixed Doubles:  Cara Black /  Juan Sebastián Cabal [9]
 Schedule of play

Day 9 (8 July)

 Seeds out:
 Men's Singles:  Stan Wawrinka [4],  Marin Čilić [9],  Gilles Simon [12]
 Women's Doubles:  Bethanie Mattek-Sands /  Lucie Šafářová [3],  Hsieh Su-wei /  Flavia Pennetta [7],  Casey Dellacqua /  Yaroslava Shvedova [9]
 Mixed Doubles:  Raven Klaasen /  Raquel Kops-Jones [10],  Andrea Hlaváčková [16] /  Łukasz Kubot [16]
 Schedule of play

Day 10 (9 July)

 Seeds out:
 Women's Singles:  Maria Sharapova [4],  Agnieszka Radwańska [13]
 Men's Doubles:  Rohan Bopanna /  Florin Mergea [9]
 Mixed Doubles:  Bruno Soares /  Sania Mirza [2],  Marcin Matkowski /  Elena Vesnina [3],  Horia Tecău /  Katarina Srebotnik [6],  Daniel Nestor /  Kristina Mladenovic [8]
Schedule of play

Day 11 (10 July)

 Seeds out:
 Men's Singles:  Andy Murray [3],  Richard Gasquet [21]
 Women's Doubles:  Tímea Babos /  Kristina Mladenovic [4],  Raquel Kops-Jones /  Abigail Spears [5]
 Mixed Doubles:  Bethanie Mattek-Sands /  Mike Bryan [1] 
 Schedule of play

Day 12 (11 July)

 Seeds out:
 Women's Singles:  Garbiñe Muguruza [20]
 Men's Doubles:  Jamie Murray /  John Peers [13]
 Women's Doubles:  Ekaterina Makarova /  Elena Vesnina [2]
 Schedule of play

Day 13 (12 July)

 Seeds out:
 Men's singles:  Roger Federer [2]
 Mixed doubles:  Alexander Peya /  Tímea Babos [5]
 Schedule of play

Day-by-day summaries